The 2019–20 Spanish stage of the UEFA Regions' Cup was the 13th staging of Spanish stage of the UEFA Regions' Cup. The winners will qualify for the 2021 UEFA Regions' Cup.

Despite initially having registered all the 19 teams for the first time since the 2007–08 edition, Murcia withdrew from the tournament before its start. La Rioja came back to the competition 12 years after their last participation.

Castile and León were the defending champions, but finally Galicia achieved their second tournament ever.

Competition format
The 18 teams joined the preliminary round, played as mini-tournaments with three teams in each group, where only the first qualified team will advance to further stages. All teams would play two games in the group stage.

The winners of groups C, D, E and F joined the intermediate stage while the winners of the groups A and B directly qualified for the semifinals.

Preliminary stage

Group A
Matches will be played in Arroyo de San Serván and Puebla de la Calzada, Badajoz.

Group B
Matches will be played in Vícar, Almería.

Group C
Matches will be played in Torrelodones.

Group D
Matches will be played in Santa Eulària des Riu, San Rafael and Ibiza Town, Ibiza.

Group E
Matches will be played in Haro.

Group F
Matches will be played in Sanxenxo and A Illa de Arousa, Pontevedra.

Intermediate round
The intermediate stage was played as a single game at La Ciudad del Fútbol in Las Rozas de Madrid, on 12 February 2020.

|}

Final stage
The final stage will be played on 10 and 11 March 2020 at La Ciudad del Fútbol in Las Rozas de Madrid.

Bracket

References

External links
Royal Spanish Football Federation

2019–20 in Spanish football
Spanish stage of the UEFA Regions' Cup